Brookline College is a private for-profit college in Phoenix, Arizona, in the United States. It offers associate and bachelor's degrees in nursing and affiliated healthcare-related areas of study. It also offers online master's degrees in Healthcare Administration and Public Health.

History 
The school was founded as the non-profit Arizona Institute of Business and Technology (AIBT) in 1979. Accredited in 1982, it became a Junior College in 1991 and a Senior College in 2001. It was renamed the International Institute of Americas (IIA) in 2002. In 2007, it was purchased by the Hamilton White Group and given its current title in 2009.

Accreditation 
Brookline College's Phoenix, Tucson, Tempe, and Albuquerque campuses are institutionally accredited by the Accrediting Bureau of Health Education Schools (ABHES). Brookline College is licensed in Arizona by the Arizona State Board for Private Postsecondary Education and in New Mexico by the New Mexico Higher Education Department.

References

External links

Universities and colleges in Phoenix, Arizona
Education in Tempe, Arizona
Universities and colleges in Tucson, Arizona
Education in Albuquerque, New Mexico
Universities and colleges accredited by the Council on Occupational Education
Private universities and colleges in Arizona